The 2016 Championships of the Small States of Europe was the first edition of the biennial competition in outdoor track and field organised by the Athletic Association of Small States of Europe (AASE). The competition was launched to take place in the years between the Games of the Small States of Europe. It was held on 11 June 2016 at the Matthew Micallef St. John Athletics Stadium in Marsa, Malta. A total of 22 events were contested by around 300 athletes from 18 nations.

Medal summary

Men

Women

Medal table

References

Results
 https://athleticsmaltadotcom1.files.wordpress.com/2016/06/csse.pdf Athletics Malta - CSSE MARSA MALTA - 11/06/2016

Championships of the Small States of Europe
Small States of Europe
Athletics in Malta
International sports competitions hosted by Malta
Small States of Europe